Desiree Heslop, best known as Princess, is a British singer who found chart success in the mid-1980s. In the early 1980s, she worked with the group Osibisa. She is best known for her hit single "Say I'm Your Number One" which made the UK Top Ten in 1985.

Career
Before going solo, she was a backing vocalist for the band Osibisa in the early 1980s. She recorded sessions on the Brilliant album Kiss The Lips of Life, which brought her to the attention of producers Stock, Aitken and Waterman (SAW).

Her debut solo album Princess (1986) was composed and produced by SAW which contained the hit single, "Say I'm Your Number One". Despite SAW's initial reservations about committing to a follow up to that hit, an album was produced that spawned five charting singles, and was certified silver in the UK.

The relationship between the artist and her brother/manager Donovan (Don) Heslop, and SAW and their allied label Supreme Records, began to decline following the underperformance of her fourth single with the producers, "Tell Me Tomorrow". The discord accelerated with her disillusionment over being excluded from input into mixes for their final single together, "In The Heat of A Passionate Moment."

"That was perhaps where you could feel that the parting of the ways, that had already begun, was truly happening," she recalled of the arguments over the single mixes.

Leaving SAW and Supreme, Heslop signed with Polydor and recorded her second album, All for Love (1987) in the United States, but neither the album nor its three singles had much success.  

Don Heslop has alleged Princess was "blacklisted" by parts of the British music industry, who he claims were incensed by the perception he and his sister had been ungrateful to Pete Waterman by leaving SAW.

"The story was being given that we walked away from Pete Waterman, and we were ungrateful. And that's not really what occurred. More specifically, there were other people that got involved with ensuring that a rift occurred between Pete and ourselves. 

"But what occurred, why these [Polydor] singles did not do as well, was that environment within the business that was in opposition to us, which ended up with us hearing that we were about to be blacklisted. And that tells you the rest of the story in terms of what happened thereafter; why you didn't hear of Princess much anymore."

In 1989, Princess released the stand-alone single "Lover Don't Go", which failed to chart. Don has alleged that the single's chart prospects were unfairly halted, after its sales were mysteriously assigned to another artist's record, causing Princess' single to miss the top 100.

"On the Tuesday, the track was 108 the chart, but come Thursday, we see nothing. We hear later on it dropped to 365, and they told us that they made an error with the barcode and gave our sales to some other record. That killed the record."

Her third album, Say It, which was slated for release in 1990, was never issued as Princess retired from the music scene and moved to the US.

She later returned to being a backing singer, appearing on the Vanilla Ice album To The Extreme.

From 1991 to 2003 she lived in the US, before returning to England. That same year she formed her own music label with her brother Donovan, OnDa Ground Music Label, which has released all her music since, and released her first single in 14 years, "Ride", with rap ensemble EEDB. A music video was also filmed which referenced her retirement.

She appeared in ITV's 2005 production Hit Me, Baby, One More Time, singing Kylie Minogue's "Slow".

In April 2014, she released her third album, The Emergence, the first in 27 years. It is the first in a trilogy of albums, the other ones titled The Passion and The One.

On February 14, 2023, she released the single "Will You Call Me" from her upcoming album "The Passion".

Discography

Studio albums

Singles

References

External links
  (Discography)
 
 Discography at Discogs.

Living people
English dance musicians
20th-century Black British women singers
English people of Antigua and Barbuda descent
Musicians from London
English women pop singers
1961 births
21st-century Black British women singers